Zhong Jiyu (born 5 January 1997) is a Chinese footballer who plays as a midfielder for Ji'nan Xingzhou.

Club career
Zhong Jiyu would play for the Beijing Guoan youth team and was loaned out to third tier football club BIT for the 2016 China League Two campaign to start his senior career. After two seasons on loan at BIT, Zhong joined second tier club Shijiazhuang Ever Bright on 9 February 2018. He would go on to make his debut for the club on 22 April 2018 in a league game against Liaoning F.C. that ended in a 2-2 draw. On 14 May 2019, Zhong had a video of him posted where he was caught drunk, after an investigation by the club and a apology the club stood by him. Zhong would repay the club by going on to score his first goal for the team on 18 May 2019 in a league game against  Heilongjiang Lava Spring in a 2-0 victory. This was followed by him becoming a vital member of the team that gained promotion into the top tier at the end of 2019 league season.

Career statistics

References

External links

1997 births
Living people
Chinese footballers
Association football midfielders
China League Two players
China League One players
Chinese Super League players
Cangzhou Mighty Lions F.C. players